Sweet Sub/Mission Vol. 1 is a various artists compilation album released on November 26, 1996, by Fifth Colvmn Records.

Reception
In their review of Sweet Sub/Mission Vol. 1, Aiding & Abetting said "the 11 tracks present a good picture of the electronic madness Sub/Mission is known for" and that "the main attraction is a KMFDM remix of the Swamp Terrorists' "Dive-Right Jab". But the rest of this compilation features tracks from stuff the FCR has licensed from Sub/Mission: Meathead, Templebeat, Cold, L.I.N. and Circus of Pain." Sonic Boom called the album "a decent compilation from the up and coming label Sub/Mission" but criticized the bands' use of previously available material.

Track listing

Personnel
Adapted from the Sweet Sub/Mission Vol. 1 liner notes.

 Zalman Fishman – executive-producer

Release history

References

External links 
 

1996 compilation albums
Fifth Colvmn Records compilation albums